Poiana Mărului may refer to several places in Romania:

 Poiana Mărului, a commune in Brașov County
 Poiana Mărului, a village in Zăvoi Commune, Caraș-Severin County
 Poiana Mărului, a village in Ceplenița Commune, Iași County
 Poiana Mărului, a village in Mălini Commune, Suceava County
  in Bisoca Commune, Buzău County

See also 
 Măru (disambiguation)